The 1930 South Carolina United States Senate election was held on November 4, 1930, to select the U.S. Senator from the state of South Carolina.  Incumbent Democratic Senator Coleman Livingston Blease was defeated in the Democratic primary by James F. Byrnes.  He was unopposed in the general election to win a six-year term.

Democratic primary

Candidates
Cole Blease, incumbent Senator since 1925
James F. Byrnes, former U.S. Representative from Charleston and candidate for U.S. Senate in 1924
Leon W. Harris

Campaign
Senator Coleman Livingston Blease was opposed in the Democratic primary by former Representative James F. Byrnes.  Blease was the leader in the first primary election on August 26, but in previous primary elections he had been the leader in the first primary and unable to increase his support in the runoff election.  This election was no different and Byrnes won the runoff on September 9.  There was no opposition to the Democratic candidate in the general election so Byrnes was elected to a six-year term in the Senate.

Results

Runoff

General election

Results

|-
| 
| colspan=5 |Democratic hold
|-

See also
List of United States senators from South Carolina
1930 United States Senate elections
1930 United States House of Representatives elections in South Carolina
1930 South Carolina gubernatorial election

References

"Supplemental Report of the Secretary of State to the General Assembly of South Carolina." Reports of State Officers Boards and Committees to the General Assembly of the State of South Carolina. Volume I. Columbia, SC: 1931, p. 3.

United States Senate
1930
South Carolina
Single-candidate elections